Fire Station No. 2, also known as the Old Dilworth Fire Station, is a historic fire station located at Charlotte, Mecklenburg County, North Carolina.  It built in 1909, and is a two-story red brick building with two equipment bays on the ground level and firefighters dormitory space upstairs.  Since 2010, it has been used as a commercial building, hosting a spa.

It was listed on the National Register of Historic Places in 1980.

See also 
 Charlotte Fire Station No. 4
 National Register of Historic Places listings in Mecklenburg County, North Carolina

References

Fire stations on the National Register of Historic Places in North Carolina
Government buildings completed in 1909
Buildings and structures in Charlotte, North Carolina
National Register of Historic Places in Mecklenburg County, North Carolina
1909 establishments in North Carolina